Walter Lehmann (13 January 1919 – 23 September 2017) was a Swiss gymnast, world champion and Olympic medalist. He competed at the 1948 Summer Olympics in London where he received silver medals in  individual allround, horizontal bar and team combined exercises. He became world champion in individual all round in 1950.

References

External links

1919 births
2017 deaths
Swiss male artistic gymnasts
Gymnasts at the 1948 Summer Olympics
Olympic gymnasts of Switzerland
Olympic silver medalists for Switzerland
Olympic medalists in gymnastics
Medalists at the 1948 Summer Olympics